Tyler Douglas Smith (born July 1, 1991) is an American former professional baseball infielder. He played in Major League Baseball for the Seattle Mariners.

Career

Amateur
Smith attended Thousand Oaks High School in Thousand Oaks, California and played college baseball at Oregon State University. In 2012, he played collegiate summer baseball in the Cape Cod Baseball League for the Brewster Whitecaps.

Seattle Mariners
Smith was drafted by the Seattle Mariners in the 8th round (237th overall) of the 2013 draft.

After 3 seasons playing for rookie league, single and Double-A affiliates in the Mariner organization, he was in Triple-A Tacoma for all of 2016 and 2017 until he was called to the Major Leagues on June 2, 2017 after an ankle injury to Jean Segura the previous game. Smith got to bat toward the end of the game for a single plate appearance. He faced Ryne Stanek of the Tampa Bay Rays. On a 2-2 count Smith pulled the ball and ended up with a double.

Texas Rangers
On July 30, 2017, Smith was claimed off waivers by the Texas Rangers.

Atlanta Braves
After the season, the Atlanta Braves selected Smith from the Rangers in the minor league phase of the 2017 Rule 5 draft. He was released on July 9, 2018.

See also
Rule 5 draft results

References

External links

1991 births
Living people
Baseball players from Long Beach, California
Major League Baseball infielders
Seattle Mariners players
Oregon State Beavers baseball players
Brewster Whitecaps players
Pulaski Mariners players
High Desert Mavericks players
Jackson Generals (Southern League) players
Peoria Javelinas players
Tacoma Rainiers players
Round Rock Express players
Gwinnett Stripers players
La Crosse Loggers players